Symposium on Geometry Processing (SGP) is an annual symposium hosted by the European Association For Computer Graphics (Eurographics). The goal of the symposium is to present and discuss new research ideas and results in geometry processing. The conference is geared toward the discussion of mathematical foundations and practical algorithms for the processing of complex geometric data sets, ranging from acquisition and editing all the way to animation, transmission and display. As such, it draws on many disciplines spanning pure and applied mathematics, computer science, and engineering. The proceedings of SGP appear as a special issue of the Computer Graphics Forum, the International Journal of the Eurographics Association. Since 2011, SGP has held a two-day "graduate school" preceding the conference, typically composed of workshop-style courses from subfield experts.

Venues

Best Paper Awards 
Each year up to three papers are recognized with a Best Paper Award.

SGP Software Award 
Each year, since 2011, SGP also awards a prize for the best freely available software related to or useful for geometry processing.

SGP Dataset Award 
Each year, since 2016, SGP also awards a prize for the best freely available dataset related to or useful for geometry processing.

References 

 geometry processing course webpage, Alla Sheffer
 EG digital library for SGP 2012

Computer graphics organizations